Daniele Oliveira (born 4 November 1986) is a Brazilian volleyball player.

She competed at the 2012 FIVB Women's Club World Championship, with Sollys Nestlé Osasco.

She played for ECUS/Wizard/Suzano, Unilever Vôlei, Hapoel Kfar Saba, and Sao Jose dos Pinhais.

References 

1986 births
Brazilian women's volleyball players
Living people